Litsea iteodaphne is a species of plant in the family Lauraceae. It is endemic to Sri Lanka.

References

iteodaphne
Endemic flora of Sri Lanka
Threatened flora of Asia
Vulnerable plants
Taxonomy articles created by Polbot